Nichole M. Danzl is an American astronomer and biologist who has discovered several trans-Neptunian objects while working with the Spacewatch survey.

Career 
Danzl studied biology at the University of Arizona. She is a research scientist, at the Columbia University Medical Center. Between 1995 and 1998, she discovered a total of six minor planets, as part of her work on the Spacewatch program.

List of discovered minor planets

Honors and awards 
Asteroid 10720 Danzl, discovered by astronomers with the Spacewatch survey at Kitt Peak Observatory in 1986, was named after her. The official  was published by the Minor Planet Center on 9 May 2001.

Works

References

External links 
 https://www.researchgate.net/scientific-contributions/Nichole-Danzl-39505769

Discoverers of minor planets
American women astronomers
Columbia University staff
1979 births
Living people